= Tariff Man =

Tariff Man may refer to:

- William McKinley, the 25th president of the United States
- Donald Trump, the 45th and 47th president of the United States

== See also ==
- Tariff
